Eophis is an early genus of stem-snake (clade Ophidia) containing one species, Eophis underwoodi, from the Middle Jurassic (Bathonian) from the Forest Marble Formation of United Kingdom. It is known from a fragmentary dentary from Kirtlington Quarry. It was previously interpreted as an anguimorph lizard. The placement of Eophis as a stem snake was re-affirmed by subsequent analyses.

Phylogeny 
Cladogram based in the phylogenetic analysis by Caldwell et al. (2015):

See also

References

Prehistoric reptile genera
Middle Jurassic reptiles of Europe
Fossil taxa described in 2015